Valerie J. Kuck (Valerie Dziubek Kuck) is an American chemist. She is a Fellow of the American Chemical Society, and she was awarded the Garvan–Olin Medal in 2018 "for pioneering research on coatings for optical fibers and copper wire and for transformative achievements leading to a more diverse and inclusive chemical profession". Madeleine Jacobs, President of the Council of Scientific Society, commented on Kuck's reception of the award that "Valerie’s research led to 25 patents and 26 technical publications published in top peer-reviewed journals. [Her] service to chemistry and to the American Chemical Society is almost without peer".

Education 
Kuck studied for Bachelors of Science in chemistry at St. Mary-of-the-Woods College, graduating in 1961. She graduated with Masters in Chemistry from Purdue University. Her thesis at Perdue, "A Study of the Direct Synthesis of Biphenylene Silanes", was supervised by Professor Grant Urry.

Career 
Kuck worked at Lucent Technologies Bell Labs, Murray Hill, New Jersey, for thirty-four years, researching innovations in coatings for copper wire and optical fibres.

Kuck has been an active member of the American Chemical Society for over four decades, serving as Councillor (North Jersey and San Diego Sections) for thirty-four years. She served on the ACS Board of Directors for nine years.

She is a strong supporter of newcomers to the chemical research profession, directing initiatives to help young researchers develop their careers – from high schoolers to professionals entering the workforce. She works especially on encouraging women to pursue careers in chemistry and to apply for top positions and awards.

Honors 
Kuck has received three national American Chemical Society Awards: a National Award for Volunteer Service to the Society; a National Award for Encouraging Women into Careers in the Chemical Sciences; and the Santa Clara Section of ACS awarded Kuck the Shirley Radding Award.

Between 2001 and 2002 Kuck served as the Sylvia M. Stoesser Lecturer in Chemistry at University of Illinois.

Kuck was made a Fellow of ACS in 2016.

Awarded the Francis P. Garvan-John M. Olin Medal in 2018.

She is a Distinguished Alumnus of the Purdue University Chemistry Department.

In 2019 she was given the Distinguished Alumni Award from St Mary-of-the-Woods College.

Selected published work

Chemistry

Gender and chemistry

References 

Year of birth missing (living people)
Living people
Place of birth missing (living people)
American chemists
American women chemists
Fellows of the American Chemical Society
Saint Mary-of-the-Woods College alumni
Purdue University alumni
Scientists at Bell Labs
21st-century American women